The EDF European Darts Championship is an electronic soft-tip darts tournament held generally at Terme Olimia in Podčetrtek, Slovenia. Once time is held in Santa Susanna, Catalonia. First edition of this tournament took place in 2012. Championship tournaments are organized together with many other open-level tournaments in one week. Players with a PDC Tour Card can also take part in these tournaments.

The most successful player at this tournament is Boris Krčmar from Croatia.

Classic tournaments

Men's singles

Women's singles

Youth's (U18) singles

Cricket tournaments

Men's singles

Women's singles

References

Darts tournaments
International sports competitions hosted by Slovenia
International sports competitions hosted by Spain
2012 establishments in Slovenia